Most pri Bratislave is a village and municipality in western Slovakia in  Senec District in the Bratislava Region.

History
In historical records the village was first mentioned in 1283.

Geography
The municipality lies at an altitude of 130 metres above sea level and covers an area of 19.01 km².

Demographics
According to the 2011 census, the municipality had 2,144 inhabitants. 1,883 of inhabitants were Slovaks, 41 Hungarians, 20 Czechs and 200 others and unspecified.

According to the 2021 census, the population has increased to 3,913, 87% of whom were Slovaks and 2% Hungarians.

References

External links/Sources

  Official page
https://web.archive.org/web/20070513023228/http://www.statistics.sk/mosmis/eng/run.html

Villages and municipalities in Senec District